Bicentennial Park is a  suburban parkland located  west of the Sydney central business district in the suburb of , in the local government area of City of Parramatta, New South Wales, Australia. Bicentennial Park is situated on the shores of Homebush Bay and is a part of the Sydney Olympic Park. The park is a natural heritage site featuring an important wetland ecosystem and parklands.

Features
It offers visitors recreation, nature-based tours, environmental education and outdoor event experiences. The park has picnic areas, playgrounds, pathways and cycle ways, access to the wetlands, salt marsh and bird hides. It also features Lake Belvedere, Peace Monument, Treillage Tower, Sundial, 'Cyrus the Great' statue, the Silent Hearts Memorial Garden and water features, including the Brickpit Ring Walk. Powells Creek runs through the eastern side of the park.

The Homebush Bay wetland is occupied by animals that thrive in the salt water wetlands.

History
Bicentennial Park was created by the state and federal governments during the 1980s, to celebrate Australia's Bicentenary in 1988. The park was officially opened on 1 January 1988.

See also

 Parks in Sydney
 Geography of Sydney
 Louise Sauvage Pathway
 Haslams Creek
 Powells Creek

References

External links

 

Parks in Sydney
Australian bicentennial commemorations
Sydney Olympic Park
1988 establishments in Australia
Parks established in 1988